Pottstown is a borough in Montgomery County, Pennsylvania, United States. Pottstown was laid out in 1752–53 and named Pottsgrove in honor of its founder, John Potts. The old name was abandoned at the time of the incorporation as a borough in 1815. In 1888, the limits of the borough were considerably extended. Pottstown is the center of a productive farming and dairying region.

Pottstown is located on the Schuylkill River.

History

Modern-day Pottstown is on land originally deeded to William Penn. Germans, Swedes and English were among the area's first European settlers. After establishment of the first iron forge in 1714, Pottstown's fortunes became tied to the iron industry, and blast furnaces  for production of iron and later steel eventually opened in the area. 

Iron and steel production attracted the Potts family, iron masters by trade. They established a forge and built a large home just west of the Manatawny Creek. John Potts founded a town in 1761 on part of the  that he owned. It is the home of the nation's oldest mill, Pottstown Roller Mill.

Pottsgrove grew, and in 1815 it was incorporated under the name Pottstown, becoming the second borough in Pennsylvania, after Norristown.

The Philadelphia & Reading Railroad mainline reached Pottstown in 1838. The extension of the railroad to Mount Carbon in 1842 facilitated the movement of raw materials and finished goods that helped Pottstown's economy grow. In a few years after the extension of the railroad, the population grew from 600 to 1,850. Pottstown's metal production grew; steel from the borough was used in the Panama Canal and Golden Gate Bridge.

In 1944, the borough adopted a city manager form of government. By 1964, the borough saw the need to reorganize the municipal government. At the time, it had one of the largest borough councils in the state, with 20 members. This was reduced to seven members in redrawn wards.

The High Street Historic District, Old Pottstown Historic District, Pottsgrove Mansion, Grubb Mansion, Jefferson Elementary School, Pottstown Roller Mill, Reading Railroad Pottstown Station, and Henry Antes House are on the National Register of Historic Places.

Politics and government
Pottstown has a city manager form of government with a mayor and a seven-member borough council. The mayor is Stephanie A. Henrick and the borough manager is Justin Keller.

The borough is part of the Fourth Congressional District (represented by Rep. Madeleine Dean), the 146th State House District (represented by state Rep. Joe Ciresi), and the 24th State Senate District (represented by Sen. Tracy Pennycuick).

Geography
Pottstown is located at  (40.249690, 75.640262).

Climate
The climate in this area is characterized by hot, humid summers and generally mild to cool winters. According to the Köppen Climate Classification system, Pottstown, Pennsylvania has a humid subtropical climate, abbreviated Cfa on climate maps. Using the freezing mark as a boundary (as is more common in the US), the climate was hot-summer humid continental (Dfa) with January averaging below freezing until the most recent temperature numbers. The hardiness zone is 7a. Despite global warming heavy snow remains occasionally possible.

Demographics

As of the 2010 census, the borough was 72.1% White, 19.5% Black or African American, 0.3% Native American, 0.9% Asian, 0.1% Native Hawaiian, and 4.4% were two or more races. 8.0% of the population were of Hispanic or Latino ancestry .

As of 2006–2008 Census Bureau Estimates, there were 22,018 people living in Pottstown. The racial makeup of the borough was 72.1% White, 19.4% African American, 0.2% Native American, 0.9% Asian, 0.0% Pacific Islander, 2.2% from other races, and 5.1% from two or more races. Hispanic or Latino of any race were 5.6% of the population.

As of the census of 2000, there were 21,859 people, 9,146 households, and 5,533 families residing in the borough. The population density was 4,526.3 people per square mile (1,747.4/km2). There were 9,973 housing units at an average density of 2,065.1 per square mile (797.2/km2). The racial makeup of the borough was 79.34% White, 15.06% African American, 0.23% Native American, 0.65% Asian, 0.09% Pacific Islander, 1.89% from other races, and 2.75% from two or more races. Hispanic or Latino of any race were 4.53% of the population.

There were 9,146 households, out of which 29.1% had children under the age of 18 living with them, 41.3% were married couples living together, 14.7% had a female householder with no husband present, and 39.5% were non-families. 33.5% of all households were made up of individuals, and 13.4% had someone living alone who was 65 years of age or older. The average household size was 2.36 and the average family size was 3.02.

In the borough, the population was spread out, with 25.6% under the age of 18, 7.5% from 18 to 24, 30.9% from 25 to 44, 19.8% from 45 to 64, and 16.2% who were 65 years of age or older. The median age was 36 years. For every 100 females, there were 90.5 males. For every 100 females age 18 and over, there were 85.6 males.

The median income for a household in the borough was $35,785, and the median income for a family was $45,734. Males had a median income of $34,923 versus $26,229 for females. The per capita income for the borough was $19,078. About 8.7% of families and 11.3% of the population were below the poverty line, including 15.2% of those under age 18 and 8.8% of those age 65 or over.

Transportation

The main east-west street in Pottstown is High Street, which continues east of the borough as Ridge Pike. The main north-south street in the borough is Hanover Street. The U.S. Route 422 freeway passes to the south of Pottstown and heads east to King of Prussia and Philadelphia and west to Reading. Pennsylvania Route 100 runs north-south through the Pottstown area, heading south to West Chester and north to Allentown. Pennsylvania Route 663 begins at PA 100 in Pottstown and follows King Street east and Charlotte Street northeast before leaving the borough and continuing to Pennsburg and Quakertown. Pennsylvania Route 724 runs along the south bank of the Schuylkill River in Chester County.

Local bus service in the Pottstown area is owned, funded, and administered by the Borough of Pottstown and operated by Pottstown Area Rapid Transit (PART). PART operates five routes Monday through Saturday out of the Charles W. Dickinson Transportation Center in downtown Pottstown along with a paratransit service for disabled people. SEPTA's Route 93 bus connects Pottstown with the Norristown Transportation Center in Norristown. Amtrak Thruway bus service operated by Krapf Coaches connects Pottstown with the BARTA Transportation Center in Reading and 30th Street Station in Philadelphia; the bus stops on Hanover Street near the Charles W. Dickinson Transportation Center.

Pottstown is serviced by Pottstown Municipal Airport, a general aviation airport, and a short distance from Pottstown is Heritage Field Airport located in Limerick.

Passenger train service between Reading/Pottstown and Philadelphia was operated by Conrail under the auspices of SEPTA until July 29, 1981, when all non-electrified routes were terminated. Efforts to reinstitute commuter trains, such as the Schuylkill Valley Metro, have so far been unsuccessful. The station still exists and is currently home to a district justice office. Norfolk Southern Railway provides freight rail service to Pottstown along the Harrisburg Line. The Colebrookdale Railroad is a heritage railway running from Pottstown to Boyertown.

Education

Public library
 Pottstown Regional Public Library

Colleges
 Montgomery County Community College – West Campus

Public school districts
 The Pottstown School District serves the borough.
 The Pottsgrove School District serves the surrounding townships in Montgomery County.
 The Owen J. Roberts School District serves the suburban/rural area to the south of the borough in Chester County, such as Warwick Township, East Nantmeal Township, South Coventry Township, North Coventry Township, East Vincent Township, East Coventry Township and West Vincent Township. It consists of five elementary schools, a middle school, and the Owen J. Roberts High School.

Private schools

 The Hill School
 Wyndcroft School
 Saint Aloysius School
 Stowe Lighthouse Christian Academy
 West-Mont Christian Academy

Media

Newspapers

Pottstown Mercury
The Mercury is the smallest-circulation newspaper in the U.S. to have won two Pulitzer Prizes. The first came in 1979 in the Spot News Photography category by staff photographer Tom Kelly. The second came in 1990 for Editorial Writing by Tom Hylton.

Television

PCTV
PCTV (Pottstown Community TV) is owned and operated by the Borough of Pottstown and provides local Government-access television (GATV) programming over Comcast Cable TV in over 77,000 homes in western Montgomery County, northern Chester County and eastern Berks County. In existence since 1983, PCTV produces programming on three local Cable Channels: 22, 27 and 98.

PCTV also covers local high school sports such as football, basketball, swimming or baseball.

Radio

WPAZ operates at 1370AM and serves the Greater Philadelphia Area. Originally WPAZ, the station changed its call letters to WBZH on October 28, 2011, and back to WPAZ on January 25, 2013. On November 1, 2013, the station began a traditional Christian music format of religious hymns and songs.

Notable people
Jacob Albright, a founder of United Methodist Church
 Aaron Beasley, NFL cornerback for Jacksonville Jaguars, New York Jets, and Atlanta Falcons
 Howie Bedell, MLB outfielder for the Milwaukee Braves and the Philadelphia Phillies , coach and front-office executive for various organizations
 John R. Brooke, Union general of American Civil War and Spanish–American War
 Naomi Childers, silent-film actress
 Jack Deloplaine, former NFL running back
 Brett Eppehimer, professional basketball player
 Nick Eppehimer, professional basketball player
 Loren Gray, singer-songwriter and social media personality
 Al Grey, jazz trombonist, known for plunger technique, featured with Count Basie as soloist
 Calvin Grove, professional boxer; former IBF featherweight champion
 Daryl Hall, member of Grammy Award-winning rock group Hall & Oates, inducted in Rock and Roll Hall of Fame
 Dick Harter, college and NBA basketball coach
 Geof Manthorne, cake artist, co-star of Food Network's reality TV series Ace of Cakes
 Keith "Bang Bang" McCurdy, celebrity tattoo artist
 Jim Mickle, film director
 Hildegard Peplau, nursing theorist; created middle-range nursing theory of interpersonal relations
 John Potts, Ironmaster, founder of Pottstown. 
 Matthias Richards, U.S. Congressman 
 Dave Ricketts, MLB catcher and coach with St. Louis Cardinals and Pittsburgh Pirates
 Dick Ricketts, NBA power forward and MLB pitcher; selected by St. Louis Hawks with first pick of 1955 NBA draft
 George Seasholtz, former NFL fullback for Milwaukee Badgers
 Amanda Smith, founder of Mrs. Smith's Pies
 Bobby Shantz, former MLB pitcher; 8x Gold Glove Award winner, 1952 AL MVP
 Don Strock, former NFL quarterback for Miami Dolphins, former head coach of Florida International University
 Earl Strom, former NBA referee, member of Naismith Memorial Basketball Hall of Fame
 Frank D. Wagner, Vice admiral in the U.S. Navy
 Irving Price Wanger, Republican member of the U.S. House of Representatives from Pennsylvania
 Rian Wallace, former NFL linebacker for the Pittsburgh Steelers and the Washington Football Team
 Buck Weaver, former MLB shortstop for Chicago White Sox, banned after 1919 Black Sox Scandal
 Harry Joe Yorgey, professional boxer

References

External links

 Borough of Pottstown
 Chamber of Commerce
 

Populated places on the Schuylkill River
Populated places established in 1752
Boroughs in Montgomery County, Pennsylvania
1815 establishments in Pennsylvania